Banyan is the debut album from Banyan.  The record is dedicated to Marc Perkins.  "They are compared to a deeply rooted Banyan tree which is ever increasing its hold on earth."

Track listing

All songs written by Banyan.

 "Baby Grace and the Indians" – 2:42
 "People Find It Hard" – 3:39
 "At the Blowhole" – 3:49
 "Christmas Tree Park" – 11:35
 "What's Left of Autumn" – 7:31
 "Cooking for Now" – 3:06
 "The Roots of Banyan" – 11:11
 "A Good Looking Couple" – 9:26

Personnel
Banyan
 Stephen Perkins – percussion
 Mike Watt – bass
 Nels Cline – guitar
 Money Mark – keyboards (listed as "The Freeway Keyboardist")

References

External links
Official Stephen Perkins website

Banyan (band) albums
1997 debut albums